The women's tournament of Rugby sevens at the 2018 Asian Games at Jakarta, Indonesia, was started on 30 August and ended on 1 September 2018. Games were held at the Gelora Bung Karno Rugby Field.

The draw for the competition was done at the JS Luwansa Hotel, Jakarta on 5 July 2018. The draw was conducted by Indonesian Asian Games Organizing Committee (INASGOC) in the presence of general manager Asia Rugby.

Squads

Results
All times are Western Indonesia Time (UTC+07:00)

Preliminary round

Group A

Group B

Summary

Final round

Quarterfinals

Semifinals 5th–8th

Semifinals

Classification 7th–8th

Classification 5th–6th

Bronze medal match

Gold medal match

Final standing

References

External links
 Rugby sevens at the 2018 Asian Games

Women